Sønderborg Airport  is an airport located in Sønderborg, Denmark. The airport officially opened in 1968; however, the first flights took place in 1950, and were flown by Sønderjyllands Flyveselskab.

Airlines and destinations 

The following airlines operate regular scheduled and charter flights at the airport:

Cimber Sterling operated the connection to Copenhagen until 3 May 2012, when the airline filed for bankruptcy. DAT took over the route to Copenhagen just hours after. In April 2013 Alsie Express was founded and started operating between Sønderborg and Copenhagen. Soon after Alsie Express started flying, DAT stopped operating the route.

Statistics

Ground transport 
Transfer is by taxi or own car. Rental car is also available at the airport. Other cities for which the airport is useful include Åbenrå, Tønder and Flensburg (in Germany).

See also 
List of the largest airports in the Nordic countries

References 

AIP Denmark: Soenderborg - EKSB
VFR Flight Guide Denmark: Soenderborg - EKSB

External links 

Sønderborg Airport official site

Airports in Denmark
Buildings and structures in Sønderborg Municipality
Transport in the Region of Southern Denmark